Hallaca (alt. spelling, hayaca and ayaca) is a traditional dish from Venezuela that looks like a tamal, though different in flavour, texture, ingredients and cultural significance. It consists of corn dough stuffed with a stew of beef, pork, or chicken and other ingredients such as  raisins, capers, and olives, fresh onion rings, red and green bell pepper slices. There are vegetarian hallacas, made with black beans or tofu. Hallacas are folded in plantain leaves, tied with strings, and boiled. The dish is traditionally served during the Christmas season and has several regional variants. It has been described as a national dish of Venezuela. Some speculate it originated from the Orinoquia. Characteristic of the hallaca is the delicate corn dough made with consommé or broth, and lard colored with annatto. Hallacas are also commonly eaten in eastern Cuba, Trinidad where it is called pastelle, and parts of Colombia, Ecuador, Aruba, and Curaçao.

Origins

Hallaca is a Venezuelan dish of similar appearance to a tamal that goes by various names and spread throughout the Spanish Empire in the Americas as far south as Argentina in the decades following the conquest. It is said to have been invented by slaves during the colonial era. The slaves would prepare the Christmas Eve meal for the landowners and with leftover meat they made the hallacas filling for their own Christmas meal. One version of the dish's origin tale has it that the daughter of the landowning family asked to taste the hallacas. She and her family liked the dish so much they requested for it to be made for their dinner party and ever since it has been part of the traditional holiday meal for all classes.

Name

According to Adolfo Ernst, the word hallaca evolved from the indigenous Guarani language, stemming from the verb ayua or ayuar, meaning "to mix or blend". From there, the construction ayuaca (mixed things) devolved to ayaca and ultimately to hayaca or hallaca (using Spanish silent "h" when written).  Another version presumes that the word comes from an aboriginal language of the West of the country, whose meaning is "wrapping" or "bojote". The earliest use of the word in the modern sense is in a 1781 document of Italian missionary linguist Filippo Salvatore Gilii.

Preparation

Hallaca filling is more elaborate than the standard tamal filling. Ingredients differ between regions and families but may include a combination of beef, pork, bacon, lard, onion, sweet pepper, red pepper, scallion, garlic, salt, pepper, oregano, cumin and some type of cooking wine or vinegar. In the version from the Venezuelan Andes hallacas are made with guiso crudo which differ from other versions because the meat filling is not pre-cooked. Some versions of the filling include leeks, Worcestershire sauce, mustard pickles, panela,  or dark brown sugar. The stew is simmered over low heat slowly for several hours.

In Aruba and Curaçao, two islands just off the coast of Falcón state, Venezuela, it is called 'ayaca' or 'ayaka'. The ingredients are pork and chicken stew, or pork or chicken stew, capers, raisins, cashew nuts, bellpepper, pickled baby onions, prunes, and olives. The dough is made from white cornmeal, and the ayaca leaves first spread with lard or oil. Cooked meat and other ingredients are then wrapped in ayaca leaves, tied with string and then boiled for about 2 hours. Flavors in the ayaca vary from family to family, and some add very hot Madam Jeanette peppers.

In Puerto Rican cuisine the dish is called hayaca and used to be a popular part of the island's cuisine. Unlike the Venezuelan variety, hayacas from Puerto Rico are made not with maize but with cassava, stock, milk, pork fat cooked with annatto, and banana leaf, and baked in traditional open-wood-fire. They are typically filled with diced pork butt braised with sofrito, annatto oil (olive oil or lard), olives, capers, chickpeas, raisins, and spices. The liquid is then strained into the masa. Because of the long and elaborate process and skills that it takes to prepare, the hayaca is now rarely available, but is still found, mostly in coastal, family-owned restaurants and other small establishments known as "kioscos" where there are still strong ties to native heritage and classic slow-cooking skills.

The corn dough is similar to a standard arepas dough. Pork fat is melted down with annatto to add color. Corn flour is kneaded together with broth and some soft butter and the cooled pork fat mixture is incorporated to make a soft dough with a golden color. A large plantain leaf is greased with vegetable oil and the dough is flattened on the leaf to about a quarter inch thickness . The guiso filling is topped with a combination of onion, pepper, parsley, potatoes, raisins, almonds, chickpeas, capers, green olives, hard boiled eggs and bacon. The leaf is tied and boiled at a low heat.

Hallaca can be made in advance and frozen.

Traditions

Hallaca is a staple of Venezuelan Christmas celebrations. Christmas meals in Venezuela would include hallacas, pastries, pan de jamón and chicken stew, but not all families have been able to afford them during food shortages in Venezuela. In 2014, despite food shortages affecting the country, the Venezuelan government created a hallaca with a length of around 400 feet, a Guinness World Record. In contrast to Venezuelan tradition, hallacas are popular year-round in Ecuador, and there are several variants across the country's regions. Along with humitas, they are a staple of traditional Ecuadorian cuisine.

Families usually gather in the morning to prepare the ingredients.

See also 

 Bollos
 List of maize dishes
 List of stuffed dishes

Notes

  Rosenblat, Ángel. (Venezuela Analysis, ???). hallaca.asp "hallaca". Retrieved 9 January 2005.
  Castillo, Efrain. Revista Estampas (???)  "Decanos de la Navidad" Retrieved 8 April 2012

Venezuelan cuisine
Puerto Rican cuisine
Mexican cuisine
Christmas food
Dumplings
Maize dishes
Stuffed dishes